The Lotus 77 was a Formula One racing car designed by Colin Chapman, Geoff Aldridge and Martin Ogilvie for the 1976 Formula One season.

Three chassis were built and, as of 2018, all are still in existence.

Design and development 
The Lotus 77 featured a slimmer, lighter monocoque design over the 72, but was similarly powered by the Cosworth DFV. It featured improved aerodynamics and repositioned radiators to aid better cooling. The front brakes were initially inboard, in line with its predecessors, but were moved outboard in a more conventional design part-way through the season. The suspension was designed around a series of rocker arms instead of the usual set up of wishbones. The idea behind the new system was to set the suspension up for a specific track, taking into account ride height and road surface, and the 77 was dubbed 'The Adjustacar' as a result. It worked in a fashion, but inexperience with such an infinitely adjustable car meant that optimum settings were often not achieved. It was quickly deemed that this suspension arrangement wasn't suitable and Len Terry was brought in to design a more orthodox system with rocker arms and outboard brakes. Later in the season Lotus hired Tony Southgate from Shadow to act as chief engineer. He moved the oil radiator to the nose to improve weight distribution and also added a cockpit-adjustable rear anti-roll bar and a lighter compressed-air starter. 

All drivers reported the steering and ride were occasionally vague and unresponsive and that the car lacked straight-line speed. Andretti did not care for the car, proclaiming it to be a 'dog'. This motivated Lotus to accelerate research and create the Lotus 78.

Racing history 
Andretti skipped the Monaco Grand Prix to race in the Indianapolis 500.

After a slow start to the season, the 77 proved to be best of the rest behind Ferrari, McLaren and Tyrrell. Andretti worked hard to develop the car, and from mid season onwards, the 77's performance picked up. It was however best suited to tracks with long corners such as Anderstorp, where Andretti led easily before engine failure put him out. At Zandvoort and Mosport Park tracks he finished on the podium.

Colin Chapman vetoed Andretti's request to race the Lotus 78 at Zandvoort, so Mario reluctantly raced the 77 until the end of the season. The final race was run in monsoon conditions at Fuji Speedway in Japan. Andretti's car was very well set-up for the track, with the car set to its narrowest width and with virtually flat rear wing; Andretti drove a clever tactical race to win by a lap from Patrick Depailler and new world champion James Hunt. Andretti was glad to put the 77 aside to concentrate on developing the 78 for the 1977 Formula One season.

Complete Formula One World Championship results
(key) (Results in bold indicate pole position; results in italics indicate fastest lap.)

References 

 Franey, Matthew. 1999. Turning Point. Motor Sport, 75/1 (January 1999), 78-85

External links

77
1976 Formula One season cars